Barazin, also spelled Barazayn, is a town in the Amman Governorate of north-western Jordan.

History
Modern Barazin was founded in the 1870s when its lands were granted by the Ottomans to a Beni Sakhr chieftain, Fandi Al Fayez, and his son Sattam, the father of Mithqal Al Fayez, who also became a major landowner in Transjordan. The village began to be cultivated during the family's ownership, before the settlement of Madaba in 1880 by local Christians. Barazin is mentioned as one of nine Bedouin-owned plantation settlements in the Balqa area of Transjordan in 1883 where settlement had been largely confined to the town of Salt during the preceding two centuries. In the beginning of the 20th century, villagers from Lifta near Jerusalem purchased land in Barazin. In 1932, Mithqal offered the Jewish Agency a mortgage of his lands in Barazin in return for a loan.

References

Bibliography

1870s establishments in Ottoman Syria
Populated places in Amman Governorate